Chase Champion is an American action comedy web series that premiered on December 18, 2015. The series stars Caleb Thomas, Nathan Davis Jr. and Sari Arambulo. The series had eleven episodes.

Plot
After discovering an old video game cartridge in his garage, Chase Champion unlocks a series of magical video game powers.

Cast
Caleb Thomas as Chase
Nathan Davis Jr. as Diego
Sari Arambulo as Nikki
Kayla Compton as Gretchen
Jesse Cheever as Troy

References

External links
 
 

American comedy web series